Acoustic Angels is a live album by German girl group No Angels. It was recorded as part of a special 'unplugged' performance at the P1 club in Munich, Germany, and originally released on a special edition of band's third studio album Pure (2003) by Cheyenne Records. Following the group's disbandment in fall 2003, it received a sole release on 5 July 2004 in German-speaking Europe, where it reached number 80 on the German Albums Chart only.

Track listing

Charts

References

External links
 NoAngels-Music.de — official website

No Angels albums
2004 live albums